Claudio Fabian Ciccia Ourdin (born 11 April 1972) is a former Uruguay football player who played for Alajuelense and Cartaginés in the Costa Rican Primera Division.

Playing career

Club
He made his debut in Costa Rican Primera División back in 1999 with Municipal Puntarenas, he soon become part of the usuals at the starting line-up and one of the most claimed players, so he was transferred a few months later to one of the two most important teams in that country.

Ciccia shares the record for most goals scored in the Costa Rican Primera, notching 41 goals for Cartaginés during the 2002–03 season.

Managerial career
After retiring, Ciccia became sports director at Cartaginés and became caretaker manager in 2014 after Javier Delgado quit. He later replaced Enrique Meza jr. at the helm in March 2015.

Personal life
Ciccia is married to Fabiana and they have three children.

References

External links
  – Nación 

1972 births
Living people
Footballers from Montevideo
Association football forwards
Uruguayan footballers
Liverpool F.C. (Montevideo) players
Alianza F.C. footballers
Deportivo Maldonado players
Deportivo Municipal footballers
Juventud de Las Piedras players
Puntarenas F.C. players
L.D. Alajuelense footballers
C.S. Cartaginés players
Real C.D. España players
Liga FPD players
Uruguayan expatriate footballers
Expatriate footballers in El Salvador
Expatriate footballers in Costa Rica
Expatriate footballers in Honduras
Expatriate footballers in Italy
Expatriate footballers in Spain
Liga Nacional de Fútbol Profesional de Honduras players
Expatriate football managers in Costa Rica
Uruguayan football managers